The Samsung Galaxy Tab Pro 12.2 is a 12.2-inch Android-based tablet computer produced and marketed by Samsung Electronics. It belongs to the new generation of the Samsung Galaxy Tab series and Pro tablets, which also includes an 8.4-inch model, the Samsung Galaxy Tab Pro 8.4, a 10.1-inch model, the Samsung Galaxy Tab Pro 10.1, and another 12.2 inch model, the Samsung Galaxy Note Pro 12.2. It was announced on 6 January 2014. 
It was launched on March 9, 2014 with a price from $649 in the US.

History 
The Galaxy Tab Pro 12.2 was announced on 6 January 2014. It was shown along with the Galaxy Note Pro 12.2, Tab Pro 10.1, and Tab Pro 8.4 at the 2014 Consumer Electronics Show in Las Vegas.

Features
The Galaxy Tab Pro 12.2 is released with Android 4.4.2 KitKat. Samsung has customized the interface with its TouchWiz UX software. As well as the standard Google apps, it has Samsung Apps such as ChatON, S Suggest, S Voice, Smart Remote (Peel) and All Share Play.

The Galaxy Tab Pro 12.2 is available in Wi-Fi-only, and 4G/LTE & Wi-Fi variants. Storage ranges from 32 GB to 64 GB depending on the model, with a microSDXC card slot for expansion. It has a 12.2-inch WQXGA TFT screen with a resolution of 2560x1600 pixel. It also features a 2 MP front camera and an 8 MP rear-facing camera. It also has the ability to record HD videos.

See also
 Samsung Galaxy Tab Pro 8.4
 Samsung Galaxy Tab Pro 10.1
 Samsung Galaxy TabPro S

References

Android (operating system) devices
Tablet computers introduced in 2014
Samsung Galaxy Tab series
Tablet computers